Novokhokhlovskaya is a Moscow Railway station of the Kurskaya line as well as Line D2 and prospective Line D5 of the Moscow Central Diameters in Moscow, Russia. It was opened in 2018.

Gallery

References

Railway stations in Moscow
Railway stations of Moscow Railway
Railway stations in Russia opened in 2018
Line D2 (Moscow Central Diameters) stations